Gegham Baghdasaryan (December 25, 1902, Tabriz – November 14, 1976, Yerevan) better known by his pen name Gegham Saryan is an Armenian poet and translator. In 1922, he immigrated to Armenia. Saryan published more than 40 poetry books

References 

1902 births
1976 deaths
20th-century Armenian poets
20th-century Iranian poets
Armenian translators
Iranian translators
People from Tabriz
Iranian people of Armenian descent
Persian Armenians
Iranian emigrants to the Soviet Union
Armenian male poets
20th-century male writers
20th-century translators